Rafael da Silva (born 4 April 1992) is a Brazilian footballer who plays for K League 1 team Jeonbuk Hyundai Motors FC.

Club career 
Rafael Silva started his professional football career with Campeonato Brasileiro Série A side Coritiba in the 2012 league season. He would make his debut on 8 April 2012 against Cianorte in the Campeonato Paranaense in a 3-1 victory. This would be followed by his first goal for the club on 29 April 2012 against Roma Apucarana in the Campeonato Paranaense in a 3-1 win.

Rafael joined Albirex Niigata in August 2014 from Swiss Challenge League club Lugano. He made his debut for the club in a 2–0 away loss to Sanfrecce Hiroshima on 20 September 2014. He scored his first goal for the club against Kawasaki Frontale on 5 October. After three seasons with Albirex Niigata he would move to another Japanese club in Urawa Red Diamonds where in his debut season he immediately established himself as a vital member of the team that went on to win the 2017 AFC Champions League.

On 3 February 2018, Rafael transferred to second tier Chinese football club Wuhan Zall. He would make his debut and score his first goal for the club on 11 March 2018 in a league game against Shanghai Shenxin in a 1-0 victory. He would go on to establish himself as a vital member of the team and he would win the division as well as gaining promotion at the end of the 2018 China League One campaign.

Career statistics
Updated to 28 January 2023.

Honours

Club
Coritiba
Campeonato Paranaense: 2012, 2013

Urawa Red Diamonds
AFC Champions League: 2017

Wuhan Zall
China League One: 2018

References

External links 
 

Profile at Albirex Niigata
Profile at Urawa Reds

1992 births
Living people
Brazilian footballers
Coritiba Foot Ball Club players
Cruzeiro Esporte Clube players
FC Lugano players
Albirex Niigata players
Urawa Red Diamonds players
Wuhan F.C. players
Swiss Challenge League players
J1 League players
China League One players
Chinese Super League players
Association football forwards
Brazilian expatriate footballers
Expatriate footballers in Switzerland
Expatriate footballers in Japan
Expatriate footballers in China
Brazilian expatriate sportspeople in Switzerland
Brazilian expatriate sportspeople in Japan
Brazilian expatriate sportspeople in China
Footballers from São Paulo